Mania aegisthus is a moth of the  family Sematuridae. It is found in Jamaica, Haiti and Suriname.

References

Moths described in 1781
Sematuridae